Jalan Sungai Tengi or Jalan Timur Tambahan (Selangor state route B74) is a major road in Selangor, Malaysia. The road connects Kampung Berjuntai Bestari near Bestari Jaya (formerly Batang Berjuntai) in the south to FELDA Soeharto in the north. It is the second longest state road in Selangor after Jalan Sabak Bernam–Hulu Selangor (B44).

List of junctions

Roads in Selangor